Spring Hill Methodist Protestant Church Cemetery is a historic church cemetery located near High Point, Davidson County, North Carolina.   It is associated with the Spring Hill Methodist Protestant Church, founded in 1830. It contains approximately 300 burials, with the earliest gravestone dated to 1839.   It features a unique collection of folk gravestones by local stonecutters erected in Davidson County in the late-18th and first half of the 19th centuries.

It was listed on the National Register of Historic Places in 1984.

References

External links
 

Methodist cemeteries
Cemeteries on the National Register of Historic Places in North Carolina
Cemeteries in Davidson County, North Carolina
National Register of Historic Places in Davidson County, North Carolina